Tomb of Azimunissa Begum is located at Azimnagar (oid Murshidabad), in the Murshidabad district. 

According to the List of Monuments of National Importance in West Bengal the Tomb of Azimunissa Begum is an ASI Listed Monument.

Geography

Location

It is about 5-6 km from Hazarduari Palace.

The Namak Haram Deorhi, Jafarganj Cemetery, Nashipur Rajbari , Kathgola Palace and House of Jagat Seth are all located nearby.

Note: The map alongside presents some of the notable locations in Murshidabad city. Most of the places marked in the map are linked in the larger full screen map. A few, without pages yet, remain unmarked. The map has a scale. It will help viewers to find out the distances.

Azimunissa Begum
Azimunissa Begum (also known as Zinatunissa Begum) was daughter of Murshid Quli Khan and wife of the second Nawab of Bengal, Shuja-ud-Din Muhammad Khan. A mosque was built at the place in 1734 by her, but it was partly washed away by a river and only a small part of it remains. The place has well laid out gardens. There is a local myth in circulation that she was a cruel woman and her husband had buried her alive. However, it is hearsay and not confirmed history.

The tomb of Azimunissa Begum is built below the stairs, just like that of her father. It is said that Nawab Murshid Quli Khan had ordered out of humility that his mortal remains be buried below the steps of the Katra Masjid, so as to be trodden on by all who passed up and down.

Tomb of Azimunissa Begum picture gallery

See also
 Nawabs of Bengal and Murshidabad

References

External links

Tourist attractions in Murshidabad
Buildings and structures in Murshidabad district
Monuments of National Importance in West Bengal